The 1963 Intercontinental Cup was a two-legged football match contested between 1962–63 European Cup champions Milan and 1963 Copa Libertadores winners Santos. It was the fourth edition of the competition.

The first leg was played at the San Siro in Milan, on 16 October 1963. Milan won the home game 4–2. The return leg was held the following month, on 14 November, at the Maracanã in Rio de Janeiro. As Santos won the match 4–2, the two teams were level on points. Therefore, a playoff had to be contested two days later, and Santos won 1–0, thus assuring the trophy.

Qualified teams

Controversies 
After Milan's 4–2 victory at the San Siro stadium, the return leg took place at the Maracanã in Rio de Janeiro. The match saw some controversies related to the refereeing by Juan Brozzi. Milan led 2–0 at half-time. However, the behaviour of the Santos players changed in the second half: they became aggressive towards their opponents, with the referee failing to punish their foul play. While the Italians complained not to manage to even cross the midfield line. Milan's Gianni Rivera commented afterwards, "Each time we touched the ball, the referee stopped us. Inconceivable. Unchained spectators, people on the pitch, everything happened".

The fouls from the Santos players were very hard, with goalkeeper Ghezzi and striker Rivera sustaining injuries. Santos scored four goals, three of which from free kicks, and won the game. There were later rumours that the referee had been bribed by the Santos management during the half-time break, others cite the relevance of the referee's profession: he was in fact, a travel agent, who was often in contact with Brazilian teams when they had to travel to Argentina for games.

As both teams had won a game each, a play-off game was necessary. The game took place two days later at the Maracanã again, as stated by the regulations, with Brozzi named as the referee again. Milan contested the latter decision, but the federation ignored the Italian's protests and confirmed Brozzi's appointment. The game began in the same manner as the previous one ended, with Santos pushing forward and attacking strongly. They also continued their physically aggressive play of the previous game, with their fouls again going largely unpunished.  After half an hour, Brozzi awarded Santos a penalty for what a lot of reporters judged as being simulation by Dorval Rodrigues. Milan captain Cesare Maldini was sent off for his protests about the decision. The penalty kick was converted by Dalmo Gaspar to put Santos 1–0 up. Milan's subsequent attacks forward to the Santos box were fruitless, and Santos ran out winners in a controversial but undoubtedly legendary final. Afterwards, Juan Brozzi was kicked out by his same federation because of that events, and opened a luxurious flower and gardening shop in Buenos Aires.

Match details

First leg 

|valign="top"|
|valign="top" width="50%"|

|}

Second leg 

|valign="top"|
|valign="top" width="50%"|

|}

Play-off 

|valign="top"|
|valign="top" width="50%"|

|}

See also
1962–63 European Cup
1963 Copa Libertadores
A.C. Milan in European football
Santos FC in South America

References

External links
Match details and lineups at RSSSF.com
Match reports at UEFA.com
Match reports at FIFA.com

1963–64 in European football
1963 in South American football
Santos FC matches
A.C. Milan matches
1963
1963 in Brazilian football
1963–64 in Italian football
International club association football competitions hosted by Brazil
International club association football competitions hosted by Italy
Sports competitions in Milan
1963 Intercontinental Cup
International sports competitions in Rio de Janeiro (city)
1963 Intercontinental Cup
October 1963 sports events in Europe
November 1963 sports events in South America